Helena Zengel (born June 10, 2008) is a German actress. She is best known for her roles in the films System Crasher (2019) and News of the World (2020).

Life and career
Zengel was born and raised in Berlin, Germany, and began her acting career at the age of five in a music video for the Berlin Alternative rock band Abby.  Her first main role in a film, at the age of eight, was in a drama film, Die Tochter (The Daughter), which was shown at the Berlinale 2017.  She also had small parts in two episodes of a German TV series, Die Spezialisten – Im Namen der Opfer. 

In the drama film System Crasher, written and directed by Nora Fingscheidt, which premiered in February 2019 at the  Berlinale, Zengel plays the leading role of "Benni", an aggressive and traumatised nine-year old. In April 2020 she won the German Film Prize for Best Actress.

After System Crasher won a number of international awards, Zengel was cast by Universal Pictures to play a leading role in the American Western film News of the World, directed by the British film director Paul Greengrass. In this adaptation of the 2016 novel of the same name by Canadian-American writer Paulette Jiles, Zengel stars as a 10-year-old German orphan named Johanna Leonberger, alongside Tom Hanks as Captain Jefferson Kyle Kidd; most of her performance is in the Kiowa language For her performance, Zengel received nominations for a Golden Globe Award and Screen Actors Guild Award for Best Actress in a Supporting Role. Zengel also dubbed herself in the Italian, German, French and Spanish versions; the dubbing is limited to the lines she spoke in English.

In 2021, Zengel appeared as Nina in "A Christmas Number One" alongside Freida Pinto and Iwan Rheon, a heartfelt romantic comedy about a young woman trying to save her uncle from himself before she succumbs to a terminal illness. The film was directed by Chris Cottam and written by Robert Chandler, Keiron Self and Giles New, and features performances by the fictitious artists, 5 Together, Scurve and Ranelle Spear.

Filmography

Film and television

Awards and nominations

References

External links 

 
 Helena Zengel  German film database with photos
 Helena.Zengel.Official  Instagram account
 Youtube Interview 2020 Q&A in English

2008 births
Living people
German child actresses
21st-century German actresses
German film actresses
German television actresses
Actresses from Berlin
Best Actress German Film Award winners